Regina Basilier (née Kleifeldt 1572–1631), was a Swedish (originally German) merchant and moneylender. She is known as a banker of king Gustavus Adolphus of Sweden.

Biography

She was born in Danzig (which was then part of the Polish-Lithuanian Commonwealth) and married to the Hamburg merchant Adam Basilier (d. 1608), who was a significant creditor of the Swedish prince John, Duke of Östergötland. 

Upon the death of Prince John in 1618, she emigrated to Sweden to protect her interests. She acquired the estates Kungs Norrby in Östergötland as well as Gripsholm, Vibyholm, and  Åkers in Södermanland, from the crown as leasehold estates. Regina Basilier was one of the greatest creditors of the Swedish royal house and often provided the crown with financial loans as well as supplies from her Swedish leasehold estates. She also continued a lucrative trading import business of textiles and jewelry and was a provider of such luxury items to the Swedish royal family. She is, for example, recorded to have sold bed draperies to Christina of Holstein-Gottorp, wallpaper to Gustavus Adolphus of Sweden, and jewelry for Maria Eleonora of Brandenburg.

She died as the perhaps greatest creditor of the crown and one of the most successful and influential merchants in Sweden. She left her business interests to her only child, Nikolaus Gustaf Basilier (ca. 1595-1663).

References 

1572 births
1631 deaths
17th-century Swedish businesswomen
17th-century Swedish businesspeople
Swedish bankers
Women bankers
Swedish merchants
17th-century merchants
Businesspeople from Gdańsk
17th-century German businesswomen
17th-century German businesspeople
Emigrants from the Polish-Lithuanian Commonwealth to the Holy Roman Empire
Emigrants from the Holy Roman Empire to Sweden